Harry M. Crump (born June 18, 1940 in Framingham, Massachusetts), nicknamed "Harry the Thump", is an American former football fullback who played for the Boston Patriots in the American Football League.

References

http://archive.patriots.com/alumni/index.cfm?ac=alumnibiosdetail&bio=12117

1940 births
Living people
People from Framingham, Massachusetts
American football fullbacks
Boston College Eagles football players
Boston Patriots players
American Football League players